Darwin Streaming Server (DSS) was the first open sourced RTP/RTSP streaming server.  It was released March 16, 1999 and is a fully featured RTSP/RTP media streaming server capable of streaming a variety of media types including H.264/MPEG-4 AVC, MPEG-4 Part 2 and 3GP.

Development
Developed by Apple, it is the open source equivalent of QuickTime Streaming Server, and is based on its code.

Ports
The initial DSS source code release compiled only on OS X, but external developers quickly ported the code to Linux, FreeBSD, Solaris, Tru64 Unix, Mac OS 9 and Windows.

Source code is available as a release download or as development code via CVS.

See also 

HTTP Live Streaming – Apple's video/audio streaming server protocol
Helix Universal Server – Multiformat streaming server from RealNetworks
Wowza Media Server – a unified streaming server from Wowza Media Systems

References

External links
 Darwin Streaming Server

QuickTime
Free audio software
Streaming